Barrenjoey Road is an urban main road within the Sydney suburbs of Mona Vale, Newport, Bilgola, Avalon and Palm Beach. There are about 1,150 houses along the road. In 1978, the Barrenjoey Road area came to national attention due to the unsolved disappearance of Trudie Adams.

Description 
From the southern junction in Mona Vale with Pittwater Road, Barrenjoey Road has 6 traffic lanes north to Newport. From here through to the northern termination point on the Pacific Ocean side of Palm Beach, the road is generally only 2 lanes wide, with the exception of a few kilometres in north Avalon/south Palm Beach where it is 4 traffic lanes wide. Since Palm Beach is a peninsula, there is no through traffic north of this point and traffic volume decreases as you drive northwards.

References

Streets in Sydney
Highways in New South Wales
Palm Beach, New South Wales